Iradj Gandjbaksh (born 6 November 1941, in Tehran) is an Iranian Cardiac surgeon who lives in France. He fitted a pacemaker to French former president Jacques Chirac.

Professional career 
Gandjbaksh is a surgeon at the Pitié-Salpêtrière Hospital, where he heads the cardiac surgery department after Christian Cabrol. Gandjbaksh and Cabrol performed the first heart transplant in Europe on 27 April 1968. He has been a member of the National Academy of Medicine since 13 November 2001. In 2010, he became president of the National Academy of Surgery. He is also a member of the Board of Directors of the Pierre-et-Marie-Curie University Foundation, where he teaches. He also belonged to the National Council of Universities for the medical, dentistry and pharmaceutical disciplines.

Works 
 Heart transplants, with Christian Cabrol and Alain Pavie, Médecine/Sciences, Flammarion, 1996.
 Wounds and trauma of the thorax, with Jean-Pierre Ollivier and René Jancovici, Arnette, 1997.
 Pathologies of the aorta, collective, dir. With Jean-Pierre Ollivier, Med-Line, 2004.

Honors 
 Officer of the Order of Merit
 Knight of the Legion of Honour

References 

People from Kermanshah
Physicians from Paris
Iranian Kurdish people
Kurdish scientists
Iranian expatriates in France
Iranian cardiac surgeons
1941 births
Living people